Générac is the name of 2 communes in France:

 Générac, in the Gard department
 Générac, in the Gironde department

See also
 Generac, an American manufacturing company